Those Who Were Hung Hang Here is the third studio album by Uncut. Released by Paper Bag Records label on July 27, 2004.

Track listing

2004 albums
Paper Bag Records albums
Uncut (band) albums